Brendan Smith (born 1 June 1956) is an Irish Fianna Fáil politician who has served as Chairman of the Fianna Fáil Parliamentary Party since May 2016. He has been a Teachta Dála (TD) for the Cavan–Monaghan constituency since 1992. He previously served as Chair of the Committee on Foreign Affairs and Trade from 2016 to 2020, Minister for Justice and Law Reform from January 2011 to March 2011, Minister for Agriculture, Fisheries and Food from 2008 to 2011, Minister of State for Children from 2007 to 2008 and Minister of State at the Department of Agriculture, Fisheries and Food from 2004 to 2007.

Early life
Born in Cavan in 1956, Smith was educated at Bawnboy National School, St. Camillus College, Killucan, County Westmeath, and University College, Dublin, where he gained a Bachelor of Arts in Politics and Economics. For 15 years he worked as special advisor to the Fianna Fáil politician and former Tánaiste, John Wilson.

Political career
Smith was first elected to Dáil Éireann at the 1992 general election for the Cavan–Monaghan constituency and has been re-elected at every subsequent election since. In the 28th Dáil, he was Government Whip on the Oireachtas Joint Committee on Foreign Affairs. In a 2004 reshuffle, Smith was appointed by Bertie Ahern as Minister of State at the Department of Agriculture, Fisheries and Food with special responsibility for Food and Horticulture.

Following the 2007 general election, Smith became Minister of State for Children. On 7 May 2008, he was appointed as Minister for Agriculture, Fisheries and Food in Brian Cowen's cabinet. In July 2010, Smith launched the Food Harvest 2020 strategy. Its overall target to increase the value of Ireland's agri-food and fisheries exports by €5bn to reach €12bn by 2020. A September 2012 progress report on the Food Harvest 2020 strategy, found that farmers and other primary producers had passed the halfway mark towards meeting their 2020 targets.

In 2010, during his term as Minister for Agriculture, he offered free cheese to Ireland's poor via a European Union scheme that had been around since the 1980s. The public received Smith's announcement poorly and it was reported outside Ireland as the country became "a laughing stock internationally".> Smith was then forced to defend his own scheme.

Following the resignation of Dermot Ahern from the cabinet in January 2011, Smith was also appointed as Minister for Justice and Law Reform.

Just before leaving office, Smith gave the go-ahead for genetically modified organism (GMO) foods to enter Ireland. He told the media that Ireland had "altered its voting position" and would back proposals from the European Commission "aimed at authorising the placing on the market of food, food ingredients and feed containing, consisting of, or produced from genetically modified maize and cotton". Smith also said that Ireland would now tolerate "the low-level presence of, as yet, unauthorised GMO varieties in imports of animal food".

He was one of just 19 Fianna Fáil TDs re-elected to the 31st Dáil, following the 2011 general election. He was initially appointed as the Fianna Fáil Spokesperson on Education and Skills, serving from April 2011 to July 2012. In 2012, he was made party Spokesperson on Foreign Affairs and Trade, as well as Border Region Development. He held this position until the 2016 general election.

Political career since 2016
He was re-elected to the Dáil for Cavan Monaghan constituency at the 2016 general election along with party colleague Niamh Smyth TD. In May 2016, he was appointed as Chair of the Committee on Foreign Affairs and Trade. The previous month he was appointed Chairman of the Fianna Fáil Parliamentary Party. In January 2019, he announced he was seeking the Fianna Fáil nomination to contest the 2019 European elections for the Midlands North West constituency. He secured the nomination at a convention of Fianna Fáil party delegates in Longford in March 2019, but did not win a seat in the subsequent election. After the election Smith told a local radio station that the Fianna Fáil party had made a mistake in running two candidates rather than one, he also confirmed that he planned to run for the Dáil at the next election. At the 2020 general election, he again won re-election to the Dáil.

References

External links

Brendan Smith's page on the Fianna Fáil website

 

1956 births
Living people
Alumni of University College Dublin
Fianna Fáil TDs
Members of the 27th Dáil
Members of the 28th Dáil
Members of the 29th Dáil
Members of the 30th Dáil
Members of the 31st Dáil
Members of the 32nd Dáil
Members of the 33rd Dáil
Ministers for Agriculture (Ireland)
Ministers for Justice (Ireland)
Ministers of State of the 29th Dáil
Ministers of State of the 30th Dáil
Politicians from County Cavan